The Yamaha RD500LC is a high-performance, two-stroke sports motorcycle, also known as the RZ500 in Canada and Australia. A lightened but detuned version known as the RZV500R was developed for the Japanese home market. Strict United States Environmental Protection Agency regulations meant that the RZ500 was not available for sale in that country. Produced for a short period between 1984 and 1986 it has become a sought after collector's machine.

Development
With the success in the early 1980s of Kenny Roberts and the Yamaha YZR500 in Grand Prix motorcycle racing Yamaha realised that a road going replica of their 500 cc racing machine would sell well. Using the similar technology of the smaller RD series of two-stroke motorcycles the RD500LC was launched in 1984.

Design

Engine

The RD500LC (Race Developed 500CC Liquid Cooled motorcycle) uses a 50-degree, twin-crankshaft V4 engine layout. Linked Yamaha YPVS exhaust power valves are controlled by a single electronic unit and servo motor and are designed to give a broader power band. The engine also features intake reed valves unlike the YZR500 racer which used rotary disc valve induction. The reed valves use two different intake arrangements, the lower cylinders are fed through crankcase mounted reeds; the upper pair use cylinder barrel mounted reeds. The four Mikuni carburettors are side mounted in pairs and feed each cylinder through 90 degree intake manifold.
The lower expansion chambers exit normally but the upper pipes cross over each other just behind the exhaust ports to maintain the correct tuned length.

The dual crankshafts are geared directly to the clutch, while the front crankshaft also drives a counter balancer shaft mounted between the two crankshafts. The counterbalance shaft, unusual on a two-stroke, assists with damping engine vibrations. The engine is cooled by thermostatically controlled liquid cooling, an auxiliary electric fan mounted behind the radiator cuts in at quite high but acceptable working temperatures (e.g. when stationary in traffic).
Lubrication is by direct injection into the inlet manifolds using Yamaha's 'Autolube' pump system. Normally controlled in other two-stroke engines by throttle position, the engine oil pump is controlled by the YPVS servo motor ensuring that the oil supply is not shut off at high engine revolutions.

Transmission

The RD500LC uses a six-speed sequential close ratio gearbox with the usual road-going 'one down and five up' sequence, the gear shafts are removable from the right side of the engine without the need to split the crankcases.
The clutch is of the wet, multiple-disc coil spring type and is cable operated.  Unusually for a two-stroke engine the gears and outer crankshaft bearings are lubricated by a separate crankshaft driven trochoid oil pump.
Final drive is by conventional for the time O-ring chain and sprockets.

Chassis
The frame of the RD500LC is manufactured from mild steel box-section and uses a perimeter layout. The rear shock absorber is unusually placed horizontally under the engine and uses the lower crankcase as a mounting point. The under-seat area is occupied by the upper cylinder exhaust chambers, the oil pump and one-way valves, the battery and the YPVS (Yamaha Power Valve System) servo motor. The battery is of the 'wet' lead acid type and a cut-out is provided in the right side panel to view the acid levels without having to dismantle half the bike!
The rear of the shock absorber connects to an extruded aluminium alloy swinging arm via several forged aluminium rocker arms. An unusually small diameter 16-inch wheel is held between  spring and oil damped forks which featured adjustable anti-dive units.

The RD500LC uses twin ventilated disc brakes for the front wheel with a single ventilated disc at the rear. A solo seat cowl was originally provided to cover the pillion seat when not in use. The Japanese market RZV500R differs from the RD500 by not having a rear-mounted pillion grab handle fitted (which gives a cleaner, more race-oriented look to the motorcycle).

Electrical system

The RD500LC features a standard 12-volt electrical system. Yamaha's self-cancelling indicator unit is used and a variable resistance gauging system is used to monitor two-stroke oil tank contents with associated warning lights.
Nippondenso capacitor discharge ignition (CDI) is used in conjunction with two coils.

RZV500R
The RZV500R was designed exclusively for the Japanese home market although many have been exported privately. The RZV500R features upgraded parts not found on the standard RD500LC and RZ500. A major difference is the hand-welded aluminium frame, which is significantly lighter than the steel version used on standard models. The water temperature gauge also doubles as a fuel tank contents gauge at the push of a RHS lever (very useful feature given their fuel consumption) and the front-fork preload can be altered from the top of the forks. There is also a red light mounted within the tachometer housing that comes on at the equivalent of 55 mph (Japanese maximum national speed limit). The speedo is calibrated in km/h.

The front forks are air assisted with rebound damping adjustment. The rear brake and gear levers are cast from aluminium, as are the clip-on type handle bars.
This was achieved by restricting the internal diameter of the exhaust pipes and changes to the carburettor jetting.
These restrictions are easily changed to the RD500 specification by opening up the restrictor plates in the exhaust to create the same diameter hole as the exhaust pipes had as standard and the re-jetting of the carburetors to suit.

Models by country
Differences mentioned are comparisons to the UK specification RD500LC, Yamaha model numbers are in brackets where known. 
Australia
RZ500N (53G)
Austria
Front and rear yellow side reflectors
Canada
RZ500S (1VW)
Denmark
Self-retracting sidestand, right dip headlight
Finland
Self-retracting side stand, extended rear mudguard, right dip headlight
Germany
Reduced load capacity (205kg instead of 211kg), self-cancelling indicators deleted, right dip headlight
Japan
RZV500R (51X) 
Tachometer mounted red warning light that activates at the equivalent of 55mph. Hand-produced lightweight aluminium frame, fuel tank contents gauge activated by a rhs mounted function switch (uses water temp gauge to show fuel tank contents available), front suspension pre-load adjustable from dial on top of forks legs. Self-cancelling indicators deleted. Production run limited to 1600 units only (all sold in the first week of release allegedly)
Norway
Self-retracting sidestand, suppressor spark plug caps, right dip headlight
Sweden
Modified exhaust pipes, self-retracting sidestand, right dip headlight
United Kingdom
RD500LC (47X early models - 1GE late models)

Specifications (RD500LC/RZV500R)

Motorsport
The bike won the Castrol Six Hour race in 1984.

See also
List of Yamaha motorcycles

References
Notes

References

 Yamaha RD500LC (47X) service manual, Yamaha Motor Co. Ltd 1st edition, June 1984
 Yamaha RD500LC (1GE-Europe) parts manual, Yamaha Motor Co. Ltd, 1985
Motorcycle.com The Grand Prix fantasy

External links

How stuff works - RZ500

RD500LC|Motorcycles by brand|Yamaha products
Sport bikes
Motorcycles introduced in 1984
Two-stroke motorcycles